Thanal is a 1978 Indian Malayalam film, directed by Rajeevnath and produced by Vikraman Nair. The film stars Adoor Bhasi, George Cheriyan, M. G. Soman and Rani Chandra in the lead roles. The film has musical score by Jithin Shyam.

Cast
Adoor Bhasi 
George Cheriyan 
M. G. Soman 
Rani Chandra 
Ravi Menon 
Urmila

Soundtrack
The music was composed by Jithin Shyam and the lyrics were written by Bichu Thirumala.

References

External links
 

1978 films
1970s Malayalam-language films